Dul Erdenebileg (14 May 1978) is a Mongolian draughts player and four-time Asian champion. In 2013 he placed twelfth at the Draughts World Championship.

World Championship
 2003 (18 place)
 2005 (5 place in semifinal group B)
 2011 (14 place)
 2013 (12 place)
 2015 (17 place)
 2017 (5 place in semifinal)

References 

Mongolian draughts players
Players of international draughts
1978 births
Living people